The Alappuzha–Kannur Executive Express is an Express train belonging to Southern Railway zone that runs between  and  in India. It is currently being operated with 16307/16308 train numbers on a daily basis.

Service

The 16307/Alappuzha–Kannur Executive Express has an average speed of 44 km/hr and covers 340 km in 7h 40m. The reverse direction train has average speed of 42 km/hr and covers 340 km in 8h 5m.

Route and halts 

The important halts of the train are:

 
 
 
 
 
 
 
 
 
 Vadakara

Traction

The train used to be hauled by a single WDM-2. But now both trains are hauled by an Erode Loco Shed-based WAP-4 electric locomotive.

Rake sharing

The train shares its rake with 16313/16314 Ernakulam−Kannur Intercity Express, 16303/16304 Vanchinad Express and 16305/16306 Ernakulam–Kannur Express.

Coach composition

The train has standard ICF rakes with a max speed of 110 kmph. The train consists of 20 coaches:

 2 AC Chair Car
 2 Second Sitting
 14 General Unreserved
 2 Seating cum Luggage Rake

See also 

 Alappuzha railway station
 Kannur railway station
 Ernakulam−Kannur Intercity Express
 Vanchinad Express
 Ernakulam–Kannur Express

Notes

References

External links 

 16307/Alappuzha–Kannur Executive Express India Rail Info
 16308/Kannur–Alappuzha Executive Express India Rail Info

Transport in Alappuzha
Transport in Kannur
Express trains in India
Rail transport in Kerala
Rail transport in Puducherry